Nishikido stable (Japanese: 錦戸部屋, Nishikido-beya) is a stable of sumo wrestlers, one of the Takasago group of stables. It was founded in 2002 by Mitoizumi of the Takasago stable.  

It was home to the only Kazakh wrestler in professional sumo, Kazafuzan, who competed in the makushita division and retired in September 2014. In 2015, the stable recruited Canadian Brodi Henderson of Victoria who competed as Homarenishiki, but he suddenly left sumo the following year. Several other wrestlers retired at the same time, leaving just five active wrestlers in the stable after July 2016. In 2017, the Mongolian Mitoryū (Turbold Baasansuren) joined as a makushita tsukedashi entrant from Nihon University, and he became the stable's first ever sekitori after the November 2017 tournament. (Another wrestler, was ranked in jūryō for just one tournament in November 2018.) The retirement of Gokushindo after the May 2022 tournament left  Mitoryū as the stable's only active wrestler (jonokuchi ranked Fujiizumi has not competed since September 2021).

Owner
2002-present: 10th Nishikido (iin, former sekiwake Mitoizumi)

Notable active wrestlers
 
Mitoryū (best rank maegashira 16)

Coach
Sendagawa Jun (shunin, former komusubi Tōki)

Referee
Kimura Kintarō (Makushita gyōji, real name Hayate Matsunagai)

Usher
Tsurutarō (Sandanme yobidashi, real name Shintarō Honda)

Hairdresser
Tokonaka (1st class tokoyama)

Location and access
Tokyo, Sumida Ward, Kamezawa 1-16-1
3 minute walk from Toei Oedo Line Ryōgoku Station and 7 minute walk from Sōbu Line Ryōgoku Station
Adjacent to sister stable, Hakkaku

See also 
List of sumo stables
List of active sumo wrestlers
List of past sumo wrestlers
Glossary of sumo terms

References

External links 
Japan Sumo Association profile

Active sumo stables